Anredera is a genus of plants native to Latin America, the West Indies, Texas, and Florida. Some are naturalized in other regions (notably Mediterranean region and on various oceanic islands). Most of them evergreen vines of dry scrubland and thickets. Members of the genus are commonly known as Madeira vines. At least one species, A. cordifolia bears edible roots or tubers and leaves similar to those of Basella alba.

Selected species 
Accepted species:

Anredera aspera Sperling - Bolivia
Anredera baselloides (Kunth) Baill. – Gulf Madeira vine - Ecuador, Peru; naturalized in Bermuda, Dominican Republic
Anredera brachystachys (Moq.) Sperling - Colombia, Ecuador
Anredera cordifolia  (Ten.) Steenis – Heart-leaf Madeira vine - South America from Venezuela to Argentina; naturalized in Mexico, Central America, California, Texas, Louisiana, Florida, Puerto Rico, Bermuda, southern Europe, Morocco, Canary Islands, Azores, southern China, India, New Zealand, Polynesia, St. Helena, Cape Verde, Madeira
Anredera densiflora Sperling - Ecuador, Peru
Anredera diffusa (Moq.) Sperling - Peru
Anredera floribunda (Moq.) Sperling - Colombia
Anredera krapovickasii (Villa) Sperling - Bolivia, Argentina
Anredera marginata (Kunth) Sperling - Ecuador, Peru, Brazil
Anredera ramosa (Moq.) Eliasson - central + southern Mexico, Central America, Colombia, Venezuela, Ecuador, Peru, Bolivia, Galápagos
Anredera tucumanensis (Lillo & Hauman) Sperling - Ecuador, Bolivia, southern Brazil, Tucumán Province of Argentina
Anredera vesicaria (Lam.) Gaertn f. – Texas Madeira vine - Mexico, Central America, West Indies, Venezuela, Florida, Texas

References

External links 
 Plants of Hawaii on Anredera cordifolia as an ornamental and invasive plant with accompanying  photographs
 Plants For A Future database on Anredera cordifolia as food

Basellaceae
Caryophyllales genera